Avroult is a commune in the Pas-de-Calais department in northern France.

Geography
A village located 10 miles (16 km) southwest of Saint-Omer, at the junction of the D928 with the D133 road.

Population

Sights
 The sixteenth century church of St. Omer.

See also
Communes of the Pas-de-Calais department

References

Communes of Pas-de-Calais